Paul Eddie Pfisterer is a German music and visual artist. He works with oil painting, mixed technique, watercolor, etching, wood carving, sculpture and mural painting.

He developed his own techniques for etching, such as dry point engraving, magnet etching and the punch and flex technique. He invented a formula in color mixing which enabled him to paint a wide range of colours, including old master techniques.

He is also a professional musician and is therefore included in the Lexicon of German Rockbands and Interpreten Rock in Deutschland.

Early life
Pfisterer was born in Waldenburg/Württemberg on 17 June 1951, the son of the painter Otto Pfisterer (Nördlingen/Nizza). In 1966, he trained in technical drawing. He studied in 1974 as a draftsman, painter and etcher under different artists.

Career
From 1974 to 1981 he worked as a professional musician. In 1980, he owned a gallery in Steinau. In 1981, Pfisterer emigrated to Australia and returned to Germany. He lived in Berlin in 1985, and from 1986 to 1990 owned a gallery in Grebenau. In 1991, he moved to Hamburg. Then he settled and established himself in 2006 at Laubach, Germany and entitled as "Hofmaler des Grafen zu Solms-Laubach".

As a graphic artist, Pfisterer made art calendars (Greifenstein calendar, Wetterau-calendar, Brühl-Edition). He worked for banks, Lufthansa, Steigenberger Frankfurter Hof, Hotel Jäger, and Karstadt. He was an art editor for Walter De Gruyter, Scientific Edition. He wrote the Dictionary of Monograms 2 (1995) and Dictionary of Signatures (1999). Eight of his paintings were purchased in 1998 by Museum Würth in Künzelsau.

Recognition
 1st prize in graphic for the community of German forest protection.
 1st prize Oberhessische art exhibitions.
 Almost 50 large formatted posters of the Saudi Arabian kings, portraits printed after the paintings of Pfisterer at airports and public buildings in Saudi Arabia. Purchased by Hessen region, different towns, museums and private collectors.
 1991 entry in the Lexikon der Willingshäuser Malerschule (Lexicon of the Willingshausen school) and Malerschule Kleinsassen (J.Wollmann)
 Numerous Australian paintings and exhibitions.
 Entry in the book Hessen in der deutschen Malerei (Bantzer/Baumerth).
 Contributed works for Grimm brothers.
 Demonstrated etching technique on television (HR 3), radio interviews, newspaper reports and Museum exhibitions.
 Numerous auctions.

Art dictionaries
He appeared in:
 Die Willingshäuser Malerkolonie und die Malerkolonie Kleinsassen (Wollmann)
 Hessen in der deutschen Malerei (Bantzer/Baumerth)
 Monogrammlexikon II (Pfisterer)
 Signaturenlexikon I (Pfisterer)
 Art Data Band 3 (Kierblewsky)
 ADEC 93 (Adec-Production/Eric Michel)
 ADEC 95 (Adec-Production/Eric Michel)
 Mayers
 Allgemeines Lexikon der Kunstschaffenden in Der bildenden Kunst des ausgehenden XX. Jahrhunderts Band 4 (Ziese/Kufferath/Demetz)
 Emanuel Benézit Künstlerlexikon (das Standardlexikon Frankreich!), in 3 Standardwerke der Kunstgeschichte!
 COMANDUCCI (das Standardlexikon für Italien!)
 Künstlerlexikon Hessen-Kassel 1777-2000 (Paul Schmaling)
 Kürschner 2004/5 (bedeutendes Standardwerk für bildende Künstler)
 Allgemeines Lexikon der Kunstschaffenden in Der Bildenden Kunst des ausgehenden XX. Jahrhunderts Band 4 (Ziese/Kufferath/Demetz) Nürnberg 1996

Auction catalogs
 Antikhof Neuenstein, 9. Kunstauktion, 19 May 1990.
 Henry's Auktionen Nr. 41, 17 November 1990; Nr. 73 Samstag, 20 April 1991; Nr. 88, 31 October 1992; Nr. 48, Pos. Nr. 48 01218,
 Antiquitäten Auktionshaus Pöter Schloss Sulzheim, 25 June 1993.
 Arno Winterberg Auktion 34, 35, 40, 42, 44, 48, 51, 54.
 Auktionshaus Wendel, Rudolstadt, (1997)
 Tresor am Römer Katalog 33 (c.1986)

Book illustrations
 Reise ins Märchenland (Freund, 1986), Bekanntmachung, Heiteres und Besinnliches (G. Freund 1984)
 925 Jahre Breungeshain (W. Weitzel 1992), Ludwig Emil Grimm (Gerhard Freund 1990)
 Münzenberg Heimat im Schatten der Burg (Petra und Uwe Müller 1995, 575 S.)
 Märchen, Sagen und Schwänke aus Lauterbach und dem Vogelsbergkreis (Dr. U. Benzel 1991, with illustrations)

Portfolio
 Kunstdruckmappe König Drosselbart (Märchenstraßenverlag 1983)

Literature
 Wasmuth-Bulletin, Burlington Magazine, International Directory of Arts, The Art Bulletin, Art Journal, Frankfurter Rundschau, Neue Gesundheit.
 Graphische Kunst (Edition Curt Visel, Memmingen) Number 51 (1998) Biography and original woodcut supplement.
 Graphische Kunst (Edition Curt Visel, Memmingen) Number 52 (1999) with 16 pictures of his work, and two original supplements (etching and woodcut)

Collection and museum representations
 Bad Homburg town collection, Wiesbaden, Borken
 Museum Steinau/Str., Museum Schotten, Museum Herbstein, Museum Butzbach
 Museum Willingshausen, Museum and collection Würth in Künzelsau
 Museum of Marbel, South Cotabato, Philippines
 A member of South Cotabato, Philippines Arts Council "Socskargen"
 Pronounced by the governor as an Honorary member to the South Cotabato Tourism, Culture and Arts Council

Exhibitions

 Gallery Atelier Periscope
 Museum Schloß Steinau
 Gallery Moderna Bad Kissingen 
 Gallery Bilderladen Westerburg
 Gallery Kurotel 2000 Bad Kissingen
 Cafe Theater Frankfurt
 Gallery Steinau, Rathaus Steinau, Ramada Hotel Frankfurt
 Museum Schloß Günderrode
 Märchenland Merkenfritz
 New Gallery Gosford
 Australien, Parramatta
 Box Hill Gallery Melbourne
 St.Marks Parish-Hall Australien
 Gallery Apollon Frei-Laubersheim, Steinau, Büdingen
 Gallery Gedern
 Museum Schloß Gündersrode Höchst, Nidda
 Ortenberg, Schlüchtern
 Gallery Fürstenbahnhof Bad Homburg, Wien
 Amtshaus Steinau, Frankfurt Book Fair 1985
 Gallery Bilderladen Neu-Kölln Berlin
 Gallery Grünberg
 Museum Castle Kolvenburg
 Fulda Artists in Herkules
 Gallery Gebenau
 Gedern
 Fulda Artists in Town Castle of Fulda 1988
 Gallery Kunsthaus Fulda
 Museum Freilichtmuseum Hessenpark 1989
 Gallery Wetzlar
 Cafeteria Karstadt Giessen, Worms
 Farben Jaenisch Frankfurt, sequence of pictures at Kreisanzeiger newspaper for a longer period
 Bad Nauheim
 Bielefeld, Bochum, Bonn
 Antikhof Neuenstein
 Art and Culture School of Konradsdorf
 Touristic Fair 1989 Frankfurt, Museum Fritzlar
 Gallery Basaltwerk Alten-Buseck
 Hersfeld, Giessen
 Gallery Posthof
 Museum Butzbach
 Museum of Schwalm in Willingshausen
 Town Gallery Mragowo/Polen
 Gallery Statt-Museum Herbstein 
 Museum Condom South France
 Oberhessische Kunstausstellung Grünberg
 Gallery Reukauf Giessen
 Museum Marbel/Philippinen.

References

 Personal Interview with Paul Eddie Pfisterer
 Reise ins Märchenland (Freund,1986), Bekanntmachung, Heiteres und Besinnliches(G.Freund 1984 )
 925 Jahre Breungeshain (W.Weitzel 1992), Ludwig Emil Grimm (Gerhard Freund 1990)
 Münzenberg Heimat im Schatten der Burg (Petra und Uwe Müller 1995, 575 S.)
 Märchen, Sagen und Schwänke aus Lauterbach und dem Vogelsbergkreis
 (Dr.U.Benzel 1991, mit Illustrationen )
 (Author Emmanuel Bénézit, Edition Librairie Gründ )
 (Author Comanducci, Agostino M., https://web.archive.org/web/20110722030728/http://www.comanducci.it/ )
 (Willingshäuser Gemäldekabinett Jürgen Wollmann 1986, Page 329 and 330)
 (Artdata Verlag Klaus Kierblewsky, 1. Edition 1995, Seite 4-183)
 (Author Carl Bantzer/Angelika Baumerth , Verlag Hitzeroth Marburg 1993)
 (Author Paul Pfisterer 1995 Edition Walter de Gruyter GmbH  )
 (Author Paul Pfisterer 1999, Edition Walter de Gruyter GmbH  )
 (Editor Forschungsinstitut bildender Künstler, GbR, Author Axel-Alexander Ziese Nürnberg 1996)
 (Editor 1992 Galerie Gerda Bassenge, Berlin S.839 )
 (Editor 1994 Galerie Gerda Bassenge, Berlin S.809)
 (Author Paul Schmaling, Jenior Verlag  )
 (Editor K.G.Saur München,  (2 Bände)
 Gold Edition edited by Lisa Reinhardt, Gordon's Art Reference, Inc., Phoenix, AZ, 2003, hardbound, 2256 pages, 9 by 11 1/4 inches, $199

External links
 Paul Eddie Pfisterer at Askart.com
 Paul Eddie Pfisterer at AARRTT.de

1951 births
Living people
German artists
People from Waldenburg, Saxony